There are more than 130 listed buildings in the town and borough of Eastbourne, a seaside resort on the coast of East Sussex in England.  Eastbourne, whose estimated population in 2011 was 99,400, grew from a collection of farming hamlets into a fashionable holiday destination in the mid-19th century; close attention was paid to urban planning and architecture, and the main landowners the Dukes of Devonshire placed restrictions on the types and locations of development.  As a result, much of the resort retains its "basic motif" of late Regency and early Victorian houses, hotels and similar buildings, and also has an extensive stock of 19th-century churches.  Coastal fortifications have been strategically important for centuries, and structures such as Martello towers and fortresses have survived to be granted listed status.  A few older buildings—priories, manor houses and the ancient parish church—are also spread throughout the borough, whose boundaries take in the dramatic cliffs at Beachy Head and its two listed lighthouses.

In England, a building or structure is defined as "listed" when it is placed on a statutory register of buildings of "special architectural or historic interest" by the Secretary of State for Culture, Media and Sport, a Government department, in accordance with the Planning (Listed Buildings and Conservation Areas) Act 1990.  English Heritage, a non-departmental public body, acts as an agency of this department to administer the process and advise the department on relevant issues.  There are three grades of listing status: Grade I, defined as being of "exceptional interest"; Grade II*, "particularly important buildings of more than special interest"; and Grade II, used for buildings of "special interest".

As of February 2001, there were two Grade I listed buildings, seven with Grade II*-listed status and 100 Grade II listed buildings in the borough of Eastbourne.  Other buildings have since been newly listed or upgraded, and until May 2013 the statutory list had some anomalous entries whereby buildings which no longer existed had not been delisted.  The most recent new listing, the former working men's club Leaf Hall, was approved in July 2017.

Overview of the borough and its listed buildings
Eastbourne was formed by the Victorian-era amalgamation of four farming hamlets.  The principal village was Bourne (later known as Old Town), location of St Mary the Virgin's parish church and a collection of houses and other buildings dating from the medieval era to the 18th century. South Bourne consisted of buildings strung out along a route which led southeastwards to the English Channel from Bourne; the present South Street roughly follows its alignment. Sea Houses (a name first encountered in the 14th century) was further to the east, where the old houses of Marine Parade (many of them listed) now stand; and Meads was further west on higher ground. By 1780, when King George III's children stayed in Sea Houses, the area was developing into a modest but select resort at which the contemporary fashion for sea-bathing could be indulged.

As well as St Mary the Virgin's Church, the Lamb Inn, Bourne's old manor house and several cottages, some former agricultural buildings and farmhouses—mostly now converted for other uses—survive from the pre-resort era.  Flint, cobblestones and red brick are the characteristic building materials of these simple Vernacular structures. Examples include Pillory Barn, Upperton Farmhouse, and the farmhouse, barn and dovecote of Motcombe Farm.  A large group of similar buildings of the 18th and 19th centuries are found in Willingdon, a Downland village which has become part of the Eastbourne conurbation and whose southern section is part of the borough.  Several flint-built cottages surround the village post office and stretch down Wish Hill.  Nearby, Chalk Farm and its barn have been converted into a hotel and restaurant.

By the early 19th century, the south coast of England was protected against invasion by a chain of 74 Martello towers augmented by forts and other defences. Eastbourne has three Napoleonic-era Martello towers: the centrally located Wish Tower, added to during World War II, and two to the east beyond Langney.  Closer to the town centre is the contemporary Eastbourne Redoubt, now a military museum.  With its dry moat between concentric battlemented walls, World War II-era additions and arched recesses for storage, it is "rather a curiosity".

Partly due to post-Napoleonic Wars stagnation and economic decline, Eastbourne was slow to move on from this early development.  Another reason was the ownership of all of the surrounding land (around ) by the Gilbert and Cavendish families, two long-established local dynasties.  Their joint decision to release land for carefully controlled development from 1850 onwards allowed Eastbourne to grow gradually into a "well-manned type of garden city, fully exploiting [its] marine setting and [its] varied and attractive landscape", thus avoiding the rapid, architecturally homogeneous growth seen in the nearby resort of Brighton or the unplanned, unfocused sprawl experienced further along the coast at Worthing.  William, 2nd Earl of Burlington—designed 7th Duke of Devonshire in 1851, and resident at Compton Place—drove much of the early growth, advancing money to help schemes such as Cornfield Terrace and Seaside Road get underway, and ensuring that the sea-facing Grand Parade was developed early and designed well.  The population doubled between 1861 and 1871 and again between the latter year and 1881, and many of the new buildings of that era are listed—for example, Hartington Place, Howard Place, Cavendish Place, the railway station and the theatres.

Eastbourne's continued suburban growth in the early 20th century led to the construction of several more buildings which have been awarded listed status.  During redevelopment in South Street, a "Norman Shavian-style" terrace of elaborately gabled shop units replaced some older buildings, and Hastings architect Henry Ward designed the "Free Gothic" red-brick Free Church in 1903.  Britain's earliest municipally operated bus service was inaugurated in the same year, and a "decorative", prominently sited bus shelter from that era survives.  The Caffyn's car showroom and garage opposite Our Lady of Ransom Church also served as that locally founded company's headquarters.  The "impressive" and "ebullient" brick building combines several architectural styles.  The church itself was opened two years earlier, although prominent ecclesiastical architect Frederick Walters' Decorated Gothic Revival design dated from the previous decade.

Anomalies

Eastbourne Borough Council maintains a list of listed buildings within its boundaries.  The most recent update was published in July 2004 as part of its Eastbourne Townscape Guide Supplementary Planning Guidance document.  This omits one building which has been demolished—St Peter's Church at Meads, a stone-built Early English Gothic Revival-style church demolished in the same year, 1971, as it was listed—but does not reflect updates made since 2004.  Specifically, there used to be a separate grading system for Anglican churches, in which Grades A, B and C were equivalent to the standard Grades I, II* and II; English Heritage have now updated its records with the standard grades in respect of Eastbourne's churches, but the council list still shows the superseded grading system for certain churches.  South Street Free Church and the former Caffyn's car showroom on Meads Road (both listed in 2009) are not shown; neither are the pair of chapels at Ocklynge Cemetery (listed in April 2013), the Tally Ho pub (listed in September 2013), the Bedfordwell pumping station (listed in March 2014), the war memorials at South Street and St Saviour's Church, both listed in February 2017,  or Leaf Hall (listed July 2017).  Also omitted is a Grade II*-listed set of structures on Church Street in Willingdon, which used to be listed under neighbouring Wealden district but which English Heritage now shows as part of Eastbourne borough.

Four buildings which were demolished after being listed were removed from the statutory list in May 2013.  These were 1 South Street, 27 and 27a Church Street, 31 Church Street, and 18 and 20 High Street.  Also until May 2013, one building in the borough was listed twice in error, under different names, by English Heritage.  It is shown as 33 The Goffs in the council list, and a listing under this name exists in the National Heritage List for England; but a separate record incorrectly existed with the name 10 and 12 High Street until this listing was removed in May 2013.

Listed buildings

References

Notes

Bibliography

 
Lists of listed buildings in East Sussex